Wybrand Simonsz. de Geest (16 August 1592 – ) was a Dutch Golden Age portrait painter from Friesland.

Biography
Wybrand de Geest was born and died at Leeuwarden.  He learned painting from his father, Simon Juckesz, a stained glass worker. He studied later with Abraham Bloemaert. From 1614 to 1618 he travelled in France and Italy on a Grand Tour. In 1616 he met up with Leonard Bramer in Aix-en-Provence. While in Rome he became a member of the painters' circle known as the Bentvueghels. He earned the nickname 'De Friesche Adelaar', or "the Frisian Eagle".

De Geest married Hendrickje Fransdr Uylenburgh in 1622, a niece of Saskia van Uylenburgh, the wife of Rembrandt. In 1634, just before his own marriage, Rembrandt visited De Geest's studio. In 1636 the Frenchman Charles Ogier, secretary to Cardinal Richelieu visited De Geest, to view his large collection of curiosities and coins.

Portraits
De Geest was the most important portrait painter of Friesland and painted numerous portraits of the well-to-do citizens of his day, many of which survive in the Fries Museum. Perhaps the most intimate portraits he painted were those of his direct family:

De Geest influenced Jacob Adriaensz Backer, and his students were Jan Jansz. de Stomme, and Jacob Potma. His sons Julius and Frank also became painters. His grandson Wybrand wrote plays, a travel guide to Rome, and published "Het Kabinet der Statuen" (1702).

References 
 Wybrand de Geest biography in De groote schouburgh der Nederlantsche konstschilders en schilderessen (1718) by Arnold Houbraken, courtesy of the Digital library for Dutch literature
Vries, L. de (1982) Wybrand de Geest. 'De Friessche Adelaar'. Leeuwarden, De Tille.

External links 

 Wybrand de Geest at PubHist
 Where Wybrand lived

1592 births
1661 deaths
Dutch Golden Age painters
Dutch male painters
People from Leeuwarden
Members of the Bentvueghels
Frisian painters